(1928–2007) was a Japanese Jungian psychologist who has been described as "the founder of Japanese Analytical and Clinical Psychology".  He introduced the sandplay therapy concept to Japanese psychology.  He participated in Eranos from 1982.  Kawai was the director of the International Research Center for Japanese Studies from 1995 to 2001. As chief of the Agency for Cultural Affairs from 2002 to 2007, he oversaw the popular Nihon no Uta Hyakusen song selection, as well as the "Kokoro no Note" ethics textbook now used in all Japanese primary schools. He died in Tenri Hospital following a stroke.

Published works
 translated by Sachiko Reece, 
The Buddhist Priest Myōe: A Life of Dreams translated by Mark Unno, 
Dreams, Myths and Fairy Tales In Japan translated by James G. Donat, 
Buddhism and the art of psychotherapy, 
Haruki Murakami Goes to Meet Hayao Kawai,

Awards
 1982 Kawai received the Osaragi Jiro Prize for his work Japanese Psyche: Major Motifs in the Fairy Tales of Japan.  
 1988 He received the Shincho Gakugei Prize in Learning and the Arts for The Buddhist Priest Myōe: A Life of Dreams.
 1997 He received the Asahi Prize for groundbreaking research in and clinical practice of psychology

References

1928 births
2007 deaths
Japanese psychologists
Jungian psychologists
Kyoto University alumni
Academic staff of Kyoto University
Recipients of the Medal with Purple Ribbon
20th-century psychologists